Changing Form (also known as Kinetic and Volumetric Space Frame) is an abstract steel sculpture by artist Doris Totten Chase, installed in the center of Seattle's Kerry Park, in the U.S. state of Washington. Since installation in 1971, the sculpture has been popular among photographers using it to frame the Seattle skyline or Mt Rainier, and children crawling around its smooth, black curves.

References

External links

 Changing Form by Doris Chase – Seattle, WA at Waymarking

1971 establishments in Washington (state)
1971 sculptures
Outdoor sculptures in Seattle
Queen Anne, Seattle
Steel sculptures in Washington (state)